Thalassochelydia is a clade of extinct marine turtles from the Late Jurassic and earliest Cretaceous of Europe and South America. The group is defined as including Eurysternum, Plesiochelys and Thalassemys to the exclusion of Pelomedusa, Testudo and Protostega. While a clade uniting the families Eurysternidae, Plesiochelyidae and Thalassemydidae had been supported by phylogenetic evidence, a name was not given for the clade until 2017, when Jérémy Anquetin and colleagues coined Thalassochelydia.

While inner relationships of the clade are so uncertain as to make the monophyly of the families questionable, the significant diversity of thalassochelydians makes using the potentially invalid terms useful to describe the different morphologies. The monophyly of Thalassochelydia was further supported by a later analysis by Serjocha Evers and Roger Benson in 2019, where the group, represented by Solnhofia and Plesiochelyidae was sister taxon to Sandownidae within the clade Angolachelonia, which, unlike as found by Anquetin et al. earlier, was outside Cryptodira and Testudines.

Phylogenetics
The phylogeny below of Thalassochelydian inter-relationships follows the results of Anquetin and colleagues in 2017.

All species, aside from Neusticemys from the Vaca Muerta of Patagonia, are known from Europe. An thalassochelydian skull from the Berriasian aged Purbeck Group of southern England represents the only reliable Cretaceous record of the group.

A 2018 study found Sandownidae to represent a sister group to Thalassochelydia, under the clade Angolachelonia. Similarly, a 2021 study found Protostegidae and Sandownidae to possibly be closely related to or even members of Thalassochelydia, although the exact affinities of the clade are still an open question. If Protostegidae is included, the clade might exist just outside Chelonoidea, which contains the extant sea turtles.

Biology
At least some taxa developed flippers similar to those of chelonioidean sea turtles, an example of convergent evolution. The morphology of the limb girdles resembles those of modern sea turtles, suggesting that they swam in a similar manner.

References

 
Late Jurassic reptiles
Tetrapod unranked clades